Igloo Creek Patrol Cabin No. 25 is a log shelter in the National Park Service Rustic style in Denali National Park.  Originally built by the Alaska Road Commission, it was the site of a summer construction camp, and was used for supply storage. The cabin is now part of a network of shelters used by patrolling park rangers throughout the park.  It is a standard design by the National Park Service Branch of Plans and Designs and was built in  1928.

References

External links

 

Ranger stations in Denali National Park and Preserve
Historic American Buildings Survey in Alaska
Log cabins in the United States
National Register of Historic Places in Denali National Park and Preserve
Park buildings and structures on the National Register of Historic Places in Alaska
Rustic architecture in Alaska
Log buildings and structures on the National Register of Historic Places in Alaska
1928 establishments in Alaska
Buildings and structures on the National Register of Historic Places in Denali Borough, Alaska